Emilio John is a retired Nigerian soccer forward. He played professionally in the American Soccer League where he was the 1978 Rookie of the Year, and the Major Indoor Soccer League. He was also a member of the Nigeria national football team.

Career
John attended Quincy University, where he played on the men's soccer team from 1974 to 1977.  During those year, Quincy won the 1974, 1975 and 1977 NAIA national men's soccer championship and John was a 1977 First Team All American soccer player. He graduated in 1978.

In 1978, John began his professional career with the Sacramento Gold of the American Soccer League. He was named Rookie of the Year.  In 1979, he moved to the New Jersey Americans.  He then played for the St. Louis Steamers and Kansas City Comets of the Major Indoor Soccer League. He has also played for the Nigerian Olympic and national soccer teams. 

When John retired from playing, he remained in Kansas City, became a chiropractor, and helped found the Attack Youth Soccer Club. In 1985, he gained a Master's degree from the University of Kansas in Health Services Administration.

References

External links
 John's youth club bio
 John's professional bio
 Career stats

1950 births
American Soccer League (1933–1983) players
Kansas City Comets (original MISL) players
Major Indoor Soccer League (1978–1992) players
New Jersey Americans (ASL) players
Nigerian footballers
Nigerian expatriate footballers
Nigeria international footballers
Quincy Hawks men's soccer players
Sacramento Gold (1976–1980) players
St. Louis Steamers (original MISL) players
Living people
Sportspeople from Lagos
All-American men's college soccer players
Association football forwards